Ralph Gifford (by 1504 – 1555/56), of Middle Claydon and Steeple Claydon, Buckinghamshire, was an English politician.

Family
Gifford was the brother of George Gifford. He married Mary Chamberlain, the daughter of MP for Wallingford, Edward Chamberlain. They had at least one son, the MP for Old Sarum, Roger Gifford.

Career
He was a Member (MP) of the Parliament of England for Buckingham in 1545.

References

1550s deaths
English MPs 1545–1547
People from Buckinghamshire
Year of birth uncertain